Tartu Rugby Klubi Lelo is an Estonian rugby club in Tartu. The name of the club reflects on its Georgian origins.

History
The club was founded in 2008.

External links
Tartu Rugby Klubi Lelo

Estonian rugby union teams
Sport in Tartu
Rugby clubs established in 2008